Kalah is an under construction metro station on the Wanda–Zhonghe–Shulin line located in Wanhua, Taipei, Taiwan. The station is scheduled to open at the end of 2025.

Station overview 
The station will be a three-level, underground station with an island platform. The design theme of the station will be based on "Colorful MRT Rhythm - Fruit and Vegetable Rhapsody" which originates from the observation findings of the natural and cultural uniqueness of the station.

Station layout

Around the station 
Taipei Municipal Wanda Elementary School
Taipei Municipal Dongyuan Elementary School
Taipei First Fruit & Vegetable Wholesale Market

References 

Wanda–Zhonghe–Shulin line stations
Railway stations scheduled to open in 2025